Video banking is a term used for performing banking transactions or professional banking consultations via a remote video connection.  Video banking can be performed via purpose built banking transaction machines (similar to an Automated teller machine), or via a videoconference enabled bank branch.

Types of Video Banking 
Today, video banking has many forms, each with its own benefits and limitations.

In-branch 
Video banking can be conducted in a traditional banking branch.  This form of video banking replaces or partially displaces the traditional banking tellers to a location outside of the main banking branch area.  Via the video and audio link, the tellers are able to service the banking customer.  The customer in the branch uses a purpose built machine to process viable medias such as cheques, cash, or coins.

Time Convenience 
Video banking can provide professional banking services to bank customers during nontraditional banking hours at convenient times such as in after hours banking branch vestibules that could be open up to 24 hours a day.  This gives bank customers the benefit of personal teller service during hours when bank branches are not typically open.

In addition, following Check 21, "cut off" times are typically later for Personal Teller Machines as physical checks do not need to be gathered and collected to be delivered to a separate check processing location.  Substitute checks, or digital images of the original check, can be utilized to process the transaction.  This can result in the typical 3PM business day "cut off" for a branch being extended well into the evening.  This could greatly benefit customers by making their funds available even sooner than visiting a branch teller window.

Location Convenience 
Video banking can provide professional banking services in nontraditional banking locations such as after hours banking branch vestibules, grocery stores, office buildings, factories, or educational campuses.

Technology Branches 
Video banking can enable banks to expand real-time availability of high-value banking consultative services in branches that might not otherwise have access to the banking expertise.

Video Banking from anywhere

Video Banking has now been taken to another level of convenience. IndusInd Bank from India, has recently launched an innovative functionality called Video Branch. Video Branch empowers the customer to do a Virtual yet Face- to-Face banking with his bank branch Manager or a Central video branch. This concept has brought banking virtually in the hands of the customer. The customer can engage with the bank for services and financial transactions by ‘meeting’ his bank Anytime, Anywhere.

Customer can simply connect to the bank through an App on Android and Apple devices as well as through an application on the laptop/Desktop. So whether the customer is at his home or office or even travelling he will be able to set up a Video conference and experience instant banking services. This facility is available to IndusInd Bank customers only

Technology of Video Banking 

Although video banking has many different forms, they all have similar basic components.

Video Connection 
Although termed video banking, the video connection is always accompanied by an audio link which ensures the customer and bank representative can communicate clearly with one another.  The communication link for that video and audio typically requires a high-speed data connection for applications where the tellers are not in the same physical location.  Various technologies are employed by the vendors of video banking, but recent advances in audio and video compression make the use of these technologies much more affordable.  For an in depth discussion on videoconferencing technologies see wiki videoconferencing article.

Transaction Equipment 

Other than the deployment location, one of the major differences between video banking and videoconferencing is the ability to conduct banking transactions and exchange viable medias such as checks, cash, and coins.  Purpose-built machines, such as a personal teller machine (PTM), enable both the video / audio link to the customer plus the ability to accept and dispense viable medias.  The system typically allows the bank teller to manipulate the PTM machine to accept or dispense the cash and checks.

Purpose-built transaction equipment is currently available, but in the future these video banking systems will likely leverage existing automated teller machines which will be modified to enable the audio and video communication.

Video Banking Services 
Depending on the type of video banking solution deployed there are numerous types of services that can be offered.  In conjunction with transaction hardware video banking can include all of the following types of services.

Customer authentication
Cash Deposits
Check Deposits
Cash Withdrawal
Coin Withdrawals
Check Print
Account Transfers
Bill Payments
Account inquiries
Process New Accounts

With all types of video banking the following services are enabled:
Process New Loans
Consult with banking professionals
Process New Accounts
Inquire about banking services

References 

Banking technology
Banking terms
Banking